George McAllister (October 22, 1899 – May 1990) was an American Negro league first baseman in the 1920s and 1930s.

A native of Birmingham, Alabama, McAllister made his Negro leagues debut in 1923 for the Birmingham Black Barons. He went on to enjoy a long career with several teams, finishing with the Cleveland Red Sox in 1934. McAllister died in Birmingham in 1990 at age 90.

References

External links
 and Baseball-Reference Black Baseball stats and Seamheads

1899 births
1990 deaths
Birmingham Black Barons players
Chicago American Giants players
Cleveland Red Sox players
Detroit Stars players
Homestead Grays players
Indianapolis ABCs players
Memphis Red Sox players
Pollock's Cuban Stars players
Baseball first basemen
Baseball players from Birmingham, Alabama
20th-century African-American sportspeople